Nu'u Tafisi (is a former American football defensive end for the Seattle Seahawks of the National Football League and current director Strength and conditioning coach at Brigham Young University. He was originally signed by the Seahawks as an undrafted free agent in 2007. He played college football at California & Mt. San Antonio College (Mt. SAC).

Playing career
Born in Western Samoa, Tafisi attended East High School in Salt Lake City, Utah. At Mt. San Antonio College, he was a JC Gridwire second-team All-American. In the 2004 season, Tafisi had 59 tackles, including 16 sacks and 23 solo tackles, and the team finished with an 8–3 record.

He started 24 of 25 games in his two years at the University of California, Berkeley after transferring from Mt. San Antonio. A second-team All-Pac-10 selection, Tafisi earned the team's Joe Roth Award (for courage, attitude and sportsmanship) in his senior year. He posted 32 tackles, 12 of which were solo, and 5.5 sacks in his final season. He debuted at Cal with 38 tackles, 30 of which were solo, and 3.5 sacks. After college he played for the Seattle Seahawks from 2007 to 2009.

Coaching career
After working as an assistant strength and conditioning coach from 2011 to 2015, Tafisi was hired by Kalani Sitake as the head strength and conditioning coach at BYU.

References

External links
 BYU profile

1981 births
Living people
American football defensive ends
Boise State Broncos football coaches
BYU Cougars football coaches
California Golden Bears football players
Seattle Seahawks players
USC Trojans football coaches
Utah Utes football coaches
American Latter Day Saints
American Mormon missionaries in the United States
Sportspeople from Salt Lake City
Samoan emigrants to the United States
Samoan players of American football
American sportspeople of Samoan descent
Mt. SAC Mounties football players
Players of American football from Salt Lake City